Estádio Zequinha Roriz is a stadium in Luziânia, Brazil. It has a capacity of 22,000 spectators.  It is the home of Associação Atlética Luziânia.

References

Zequinha